This page details statistics and records of the Crusaders Rugby League club.

Statistics

Seasons

Opposition

Attendance

Players

Records

Club

Super League

Appearances & Points

Tries & Goals

References

Statistics and records